Daniel Mancinelli (born 23 July 1988, in San Severino Marche) is a professional racing driver from Italy.

Career

Karting
Mancinelli enjoyed a long karting career prior to stepping up to single-seater racing. In 2003, he finished fourth in the Italian Open Masters ICA Junior class, behind Sébastien Buemi, Stefano Coletti and Miguel Molina. The following year, he finished fourth in the European Championship ICA class and fifth in the Italian Open Masters ICA. 2005 saw Mancinelli finish fourth in the same competition, one place behind Jaime Alguersuari.

In 2007, he won the Copa Campeones Trophy ICA class, whilst also taking top three positions in the South Garda Winter Cup ICA and Italian Open Masters ICA.

Formula Azzurra
Mancinelli began his Formula Racing career in 2006, driving in the Italian Formula Azzurra series. He secured one podium position in his four races, although he was unclassified in the final standings.

Formula Renault

In 2007, he moved up to race in the Italian Formula Renault 2.0 Championship with CO2 Motorsport. In his first season in the category, he scored 78 points to finish in sixteenth place. Mancinelli remained in the series the following year, although he only took part in the final six races of the season. He finished fifteenth in the championship after taking two podium places, including his first win at Mugello.

In November 2008, Mancinelli took part in the Italian Formula Renault 2.0 Winter Series, which was contested over two races at the Imola circuit. He won the first race and finished fifth in the second event to take the title ahead of Kazim Vasiliauskas.

Mancinelli stayed in the main championship for a third season in 2009, joining the One Racing team. After securing six race wins, he comfortably won the title at Mugello with a round to spare.

Mancinelli also took part in eight races of the 2009 Eurocup Formula Renault 2.0 season, taking a best result of sixth at the opening round in Barcelona to be classified in nineteenth place in the final standings. He returned to the Eurocup at the 2010 season-opening round at Ciudad del Motor de Aragón, finishing the races in seventh and ninth places.

International Formula Master
For 2008, Mancinelli stepped up to the International Formula Master series. He began the season with Euronova Racing, but switched to the Scuderia Famà team after the fourth round of the season at Estoril. He took his maiden podium finish in the fifth round at Brands Hatch and eventually finished the year in thirteenth place.

Formula Three
In October 2008, Mancinelli made his Formula Three debut, racing for the BVM - Target Racing team in the final round of the Italian Formula Three season at Vallelunga. He finished the first race in sixth place before taking third in race two, behind Francesco Castellacci and series champion Mirko Bortolotti. He scored enough points in the two races to be classified thirteenth in the standings. He will return to the series in 2010, partnering Vittorio Ghirelli at Team Ghinzani.

Other Series
In 2008, Mancinelli also competed in two races of the Porsche Carrera Cup Italy, taking a podium position at Spa-Francorchamps.

In October 2009, Mancinelli tested a Formula Renault 3.5 Series car at Motorland Aragón for newly crowned team champions Draco Racing. He completed a total of 62 laps during the test, recording a best time of 1:44.027 on the second day of running.

Racing record

Career summary

Complete GP3 Series results
(key) (Races in bold indicate pole position) (Races in italics indicate fastest lap)

References

External links

 Official website
 Career details from Driver Database

1988 births
Living people
Italian racing drivers
Formula Azzurra drivers
International Formula Master drivers
Italian Formula Renault 2.0 drivers
Formula Renault Eurocup drivers
Italian Formula Three Championship drivers
Italian GP3 Series drivers
Sportspeople from the Province of Macerata
Audi Sport drivers
BVM Target drivers
Euronova Racing drivers
Mücke Motorsport drivers
RP Motorsport drivers
Conquest Racing drivers
24H Series drivers